The hydroxyl radical is the diatomic molecule . The hydroxyl radical is very stable as a dilute gas, but it decays very rapidly in the condensed phase. It is pervasive in some situations. Most notably the hydroxyl radicals are produced from the decomposition of hydroperoxides (ROOH) or, in atmospheric chemistry, by the reaction of excited atomic oxygen with water. It is also important in the field of radiation chemistry, since it leads to the formation of hydrogen peroxide and oxygen, which can enhance corrosion and SCC in coolant systems subjected to radioactive environments. 

In organic synthesis, hydroxyl radicals are most commonly generated by photolysis of 1-hydroxy-2(1H)-pyridinethione.

Notation
The unpaired electron of the hydroxyl radical is officially represented by a middle dot, •, beside the O.

Biology
Hydroxyl radicals can occasionally be produced as a byproduct of immune action. Macrophages and microglia most frequently generate this compound when exposed to very specific pathogens, such as certain bacteria. The destructive action of hydroxyl radicals has been implicated in several neurological autoimmune diseases such as HAND when immune cells become over-activated and toxic to neighboring healthy cells.

The hydroxyl radical can damage virtually all types of macromolecules: carbohydrates, nucleic acids (mutations), lipids (lipid peroxidation), and amino acids (e.g. conversion of phenylalanine to m-tyrosine and o-tyrosine). The hydroxyl radical has a very short in vivo half-life of approximately 10−9 seconds and a high reactivity. This makes it a very dangerous compound to the organism. However, humans, animals and plants have evolved to coexist with hydroxyl radicals, and hydroxyl radicals cannot enter the blood stream or tissues within the body.

Unlike superoxide, which can be detoxified by superoxide dismutase, the hydroxyl radical cannot be eliminated by an enzymatic reaction.

Effects on pathogens 
Hydroxyl radicals are known to be important in the activity of some disinfectants, because they attack essential cell components in bacteria (both gram -ve and +ve) and oxidise the surface structures of viruses. Hydroxyl radicals disrupt the lipid envelope and/or capsid around the virus, causing lysing. They also penetrate the virus’s interior and disrupt the genome. These actions inactivate the virus. The disinfectant properties of hydrogen peroxide arise from these mechanisms.

Effects on allergens 
Hydroxyl radicals have been shown to modify the IgE-binding capacity in pollens, spores and pet dander through the degradation and modification of the tertiary structure and/or the induction of protein denaturation and/or aggregation, resulting in a modified allergen structure. Hydroxyl radicals instantly denature Der p1 and Der f1 (house dust mites). Hydroxyl radicals oxidise their protein structures, for example causing protein backbone damage due primarily to a hydrogen abstraction or oxygen addition. Both hydroxyl radical initiated oxidation mechanisms result in a modified allergen structure. Modified allergen structures are no longer recognised by the immune system and therefore histamine and other chemical mediators are not released.

Water purification
Hydroxyl radicals play a key role in the oxidative destruction of organic pollutants using a series of methodologies collectively known as advanced oxidation processes (AOPs). The destruction of pollutants in AOPs is based on the non-selective reaction of hydroxyl radicals on organic compounds. It is highly effective against a series of pollutants including pesticides, pharmaceutical compounds, dyes, etc.

Air purification 

The hydroxyl radical is often referred to as the "detergent" of the troposphere because it reacts with many pollutants, decomposing them, often acting as the first step to their removal. It also has an important role in eliminating some greenhouse gases like methane and ozone, as well as inactivating pathogenic viruses and bacteria and neutralising allergenic pollens and mould spores. The rate of reaction with the hydroxyl radical often determines how long many pollutants last in the atmosphere, if they do not undergo photolysis or being rained out. For instance methane, which reacts relatively slowly with hydroxyl radicals, has an average lifetime of over 5 years and many CFCs have lifetimes of 50 years or more. Other pollutants, such as larger hydrocarbons, can have very short average lifetimes of less than a few hours.

The first reaction with many volatile organic compounds (VOCs) is the removal of a hydrogen atom, forming water and an alkyl radical (R•).
•OH + RH → H2O + R•
The alkyl radical will typically react rapidly with oxygen forming a peroxy radical.

R• + O2 → RO

The fate of this radical in the troposphere is dependent on factors such as the amount of sunlight, pollution in the atmosphere and the nature of the alkyl radical that formed it.

The atmospheric chemistry leading to hydroxyl radical creation is generally absent indoors. However, new technologies, pioneered by NASA (see Next Generation Hybrid Photo-Catalytic Oxidation (PCO) for Trace Contaminant Control (H-PCO)), have now made it possible to reproduce the outdoor effects of hydroxyl radicals indoors, enabling the continuous deactivation of viruses and bacteria, removal of toxic gases (such as ammonia, carbon monoxide and formaldehyde) and odours, and neutralisation of allergens throughout an inside space. In a similar development, Engineered Water Nanostructures (EWNS) are synthesized using two processes in parallel, namely, electrospraying and ionization of water. Pressurized water exits a hypodermic needle into an electric field (3–5 kV) to produce a large number of reactive oxygen species (ROS), primarily hydroxyl (OH•) and superoxide radicals. Good results were reported inactivating pathogens.

In Earth's atmosphere
Hydroxyl radicals are created in the atmosphere by two principal chemical reactions:

 During daylight hours, a photochemical reaction occurs in the atmosphere where different wavelengths of light interact with water and terpenes (secreted from plants) in the air to produce simpler by-products known as Reactive Oxygen Species (ROS). One of the main types of ROS is the hydroxyl radical.
 In addition, during the entire 24-hour cycle, OH is formed through the reaction between terpenes and ozone.

The hydroxyl •OH radical is one of the main chemical species controlling the oxidizing capacity of the global Earth atmosphere. This oxidizing reactive species has a major impact on the concentrations and distribution of greenhouse gases and pollutants in the Earth atmosphere. It is the most widespread oxidizer in the troposphere, the lowest part of the atmosphere. Understanding •OH variability is important to evaluating human impacts on the atmosphere and climate. The •OH species has a lifetime in the Earth atmosphere of less than one second. Understanding the role of •OH in the oxidation process of methane (CH4) present in the atmosphere to first carbon monoxide (CO) and then carbon dioxide (CO2) is important for assessing the residence time of this greenhouse gas, the overall carbon budget of the troposphere, and its influence on the process of global warming. The lifetime of •OH radicals in the Earth atmosphere is very short, therefore •OH concentrations in the air are very low and very sensitive techniques are required for its direct detection. Global average hydroxyl radical concentrations have been measured indirectly by analyzing methyl chloroform (CH3CCl3) present in the air. The results obtained by Montzka et al. (2011) shows that the interannual variability in •OH estimated from CH3CCl3 measurements is small, indicating that global •OH is generally well buffered against perturbations. This small variability is consistent with measurements of methane and other trace gases primarily oxidized by •OH, as well as global photochemical model calculations.

In 2014, researchers reported their discovery of a "hole" or absence of hydroxyl throughout the entire depth of the troposphere across a large region of the tropical West Pacific. They suggested that this hole is permitting large quantities of ozone-degrading chemicals to reach the stratosphere, and that this may be significantly reinforcing ozone depletion in the polar regions with potential consequences for the climate of the Earth.

Astronomy

First interstellar detection
The first experimental evidence for the presence of 18 cm absorption lines of the hydroxyl (•OH) radical in the radio absorption spectrum of Cassiopeia A was obtained by Weinreb et al. based on observations made during the period October 15–29, 1963.

Important subsequent detections

Energy levels
•OH is a diatomic molecule. The electronic angular momentum along the molecular axis is +1 or −1, and the electronic spin angular momentum S = . Because of the orbit-spin coupling, the spin angular momentum can be oriented in parallel or anti parallel directions to the orbital angular momentum, producing the splitting into Π and Π states. The 2Π ground state of •OH is split by lambda doubling interaction (an interaction between the nuclei rotation and the unpaired electron motion around its orbit). Hyperfine interaction with the unpaired spin of the proton further splits the levels.

Chemistry

Production pathways
The •OH radical is linked with the production of H2O in molecular clouds. Studies of •OH distribution in Taurus Molecular Cloud-1 (TMC-1) suggest that in dense gas, •OH is mainly formed by dissociative recombination of H3O+. Dissociative recombination is the reaction in which a molecular ion recombines with an electron and dissociates into neutral fragments. Important formation mechanisms for •OH are:

Destruction pathways
Small neutral molecules in the interstellar clouds may be formed by reactions of •H and •OH. The formation of O2 occurs in the gas phase via the neutral exchange reaction between O and •OH, which is also the main sink for •OH in dense regions.

Atomic oxygen takes part both in the production and destruction of •OH, so the abundance of •OH depends mainly on the H3+ abundance. Then, important chemical pathways leading from •OH radicals are:

Rate constants and relative rates for important formation and destruction mechanisms
Rate constants can be derived from the dataset published in a website. Rate constants have the form:

The following table has the rate constants calculated for a typical temperature in a dense cloud .
{| class="wikitable sortable"
|-
! Reaction
|-
| 
| 
|-
| 
| 
|-
| 
| 
|-
| 
| 
|-
| 
| 
|-
| 
| 
|-
| 
| 
|-
| 
| 
|-
| 
| 
|-
| 
| 
|-
| 
| 
|}

Formation rates rix can be obtained using the rate constants k(T) and the abundances of the reactants species C and D:

where [Y] represents the abundance of the species Y. In this approach, abundances were taken from The UMIST database for astrochemistry 2006, and the values are relatives to the H2 density. The following table shows the ratio  in order to get a view of the most important reactions.

{| class="wikitable"
|-
!
! r
! r
! r
! r
! r
! r
|-
| r
| 1.0
| 0.043
| 0.013
| 0.035
| 
| 0.679
|}

The results suggest that  reaction is the most prominent reaction in dense clouds. It is in concordance with Harju et al. 2000.

The next table shows the results by doing the same procedure for the destruction reaction:
{| class="wikitable"
|-
!
! r
! r
! r
! r
! r
|-
| r
| 1.0
| 
| 0.152
| 
| 
|}

The results show that reaction  is the main sink for •OH in dense clouds.

Interstellar observations
Discoveries of the microwave spectra of a considerable number of molecules prove the existence of rather complex molecules in the interstellar clouds, and provides the possibility to study dense clouds, which are obscured by the dust they contain. The •OH molecule has been observed in the interstellar medium since 1963 through its 18 cm transitions. In the subsequent years •OH was observed by its rotational transitions at far infrared wavelengths, mainly in the Orion region. Because each rotational level of •OH is split in by lambda doubling, astronomers can observe a wide variety of energy states from the ground state.

Tracer of shock conditions
Very high densities are required to thermalize the rotational transitions of •OH, so it is difficult to detect far-infrared emission lines from a quiescent molecular cloud. Even at H2 densities of 106 cm−3, dust must be optically thick at infrared wavelengths. But the passage of a shock wave through a molecular cloud is precisely the process which can bring the molecular gas out of equilibrium with the dust, making observations of far-infrared emission lines possible. A moderately fast shock may produce a transient raise in the •OH abundance relative to hydrogen. So, it is possible that far-infrared emission lines of •OH can be a good diagnostic of shock conditions.

In diffuse clouds
Diffuse clouds are of astronomical interest because they play a primary role in the evolution and thermodynamics of ISM. Observation of the abundant atomic hydrogen in 21 cm has shown good signal-to-noise ratio in both emission and absorption. Nevertheless, HI observations have a fundamental difficulty when they are directed at low mass regions of the hydrogen nucleus, as the center part of a diffuse cloud: the thermal width of the hydrogen lines are of the same order as the internal velocities of structures of interest, so cloud components of various temperatures and central velocities are indistinguishable in the spectrum. Molecular line observations in principle do not suffer from this problem. Unlike HI, molecules generally have excitation temperature Tex ≪ Tkin, so that emission is very weak even from abundant species. CO and •OH are the most easily studied candidate molecules. CO has transitions in a region of the spectrum (wavelength < 3 mm) where there are not strong background continuum sources, but •OH has the 18 cm emission, line convenient for absorption observations. Observation studies provide the most sensitive means of detections of molecules with subthermal excitation, and can give the opacity of the spectral line, which is a central issue to model the molecular region.

Studies based in the kinematic comparison of •OH and H I absorption lines from diffuse clouds are useful in determining their physical conditions, especially because heavier elements provide higher velocity resolution.

Masers
•OH masers, a type of astrophysical maser, were the first masers to be discovered in space and have been observed in more environments than any other type of maser.

In the Milky Way, •OH masers are found in stellar masers (evolved stars), interstellar masers (regions of massive star formation), or in the interface between supernova remnants and molecular material. Interstellar •OH masers are often observed from molecular material surrounding ultracompact H II regions (UC H II). But there are masers associated with very young stars that have yet to create UC H II regions. This class of •OH masers appears to form near the edges of very dense material, place where H2O masers form, and where total densities drop rapidly and UV radiation form young stars can dissociate the H2O molecules. So, observations of •OH masers in these regions, can be an important way to probe the distribution of the important H2O molecule in interstellar shocks at high spatial resolutions.

See also
Hydroxyl ion absorption
Hydrogen darkening
Hydrogen cycle

References

External links
Hydroxyl found in atmosphere of Venus.
University lecture notes from the University of Colorado on Atmospheric Chemistry.
Hydroxyl Air Purifier.

Alcohols
Biological processes
Environmental chemistry
Free radicals
Hydroxides
Reactive intermediates
Reactive oxygen species